Megan Kiska is an American military officer in the Idaho Air National Guard and politician from Idaho. Kiska was a Republican member of Idaho House of Representatives for District 21, Seat B.

Education 
Kiska earned a Bachelors degree from California State University, Hayward in California. Kiska graduated from Air Force Technical School. Kiska graduated from Reserve Officer Training Corps at the University of California, Berkeley. Kiska earned a Master's degree in international relations and affairs from University of Oklahoma.

Career 
In 2006, Kiska became an Airport Operations Manager at Denver International Airport in Denver, Colorado, until 2010.

In 2010, Kiska became an Area Manager with Amazon, until 2012.

Kiska, a Captain, was an inspector general and real property officer for the 124th Fighter Wing, a unit of the Idaho Air National Guard, in Idaho.

In May 2019, Kiska was appointed by Idaho Governor Brad Little to serve as a Republican member of Idaho House of Representatives for District 21, seat B to fill the vacancy from Thomas Dayley.

Personal life 
Kiska's husband is Robin. They have two children. Kiska and her family live in Boise, Idaho.

References

External links 
 Megan Kiska at idahohouserepublicancaucus.com
 Megan Kiska at ballotpedia.org
 Megan Kiska at idaho.gov

Living people
Republican Party members of the Idaho House of Representatives
People from Boise, Idaho
Women in the United States Air Force
Women state legislators in Idaho
21st-century American politicians
21st-century American women politicians
California State University, East Bay alumni
University of Oklahoma alumni
Year of birth missing (living people)